Pneumococcal polysaccharide vaccine (PPSV)—known as Pneumovax 23 (PPV-23)—is the first pneumococcal vaccine derived from a capsular polysaccharide.

The polysaccharide antigens were used to induce type-specific antibodies that enhanced opsonization, phagocytosis, and killing of Streptococcus pneumoniae (pneumococcal) bacteria by phagocytic immune cells. The pneumococcal polysaccharide vaccine is widely used in high-risk adults. As a result, there have been important reductions in the incidence, morbidity, and mortality from invasive pneumococcal disease.

First used in 1945, the tetravalent vaccine was not widely distributed, since its deployment coincided with the discovery of penicillin. In the 1970s, Robert Austrian championed the manufacture and distribution of a 14-valent PPSV. This evolved in 1983 to a 23-valent formulation (PPSV23). A significant breakthrough affecting the burden of pneumococcal disease was the licensing of a protein conjugate heptavalent vaccine (PCV7) beginning in February 2000.

Medical uses
In the United States, PPSV is recommended for adults 65 years of age or older, adults with serious long-term health problems, smokers, and children older than two years with serious long-term health problems, affording protection for five years or more. The World Health Organization (WHO) recommendations are similar. The WHO does not recommend use of PPSV in routine childhood immunization programs. The recommendations in the UK are similar, but include people with occupational hazards.

Pneumococcal vaccine may be beneficial to control exacerbations of chronic obstructive pulmonary disease (COPD).

PPSV is important for those with HIV/AIDS.  In Canadian patients infected with HIV, the vaccine has been reported to decrease the incidence of invasive pneumococcal disease from 768 per 100,000 person–years to 244 per 100,000 patient–years. Because of the low level of evidence for benefit, 2008 WHO guidelines do not recommend routine immunization with PPV-23 for HIV patients, and suggests preventing pneumococcal disease indirectly with trimethoprim–sulfamethoxazole chemoprophylaxis and antiretrovirals. While the U.S. Centers for Disease Control and Prevention (CDC) recommends immunization in all patients infected with HIV.

Adverse events
The most common adverse reactions (reported in  more than 10% of subjects vaccinated with PPSV in clinical trials) were: pain, soreness or tenderness at the site of injection (60.0%), injection-site swelling or temporary thickening or hardening of the skin (20.3%), headache (17.6%), injection-site redness (16.4%), weakness and fatigue (13.2%), and muscle pain (11.9%).

Vaccination schedule

Adults and children over two years of age
The 23-valent vaccine (for example, Pneumovax 23) is effective against 23 different pneumococcal capsular types (serotypes 1, 2, 3, 4, 5, 6B, 7F, 8, 9N, 9V, 10A, 11A, 12F, 14, 15B, 17F, 18C, 19A, 19F, 20, 22F, 23F, and 33F), and so covers 90 percent of the types found in pneumococcal bloodstream infections.

Young children
Children under the age of two years fail to mount an adequate response to the 23-valent adult vaccine, and instead a 13-valent pneumococcal conjugated vaccine (PCV13; for example, Prevnar 13) is used instead. PCV13 replaced PCV7, adding six new serotypes to the vaccine. While this covers only thirteen strains out of more than ninety strains, these thirteen strains caused 80–90 percent of cases of severe pneumococcal disease in the U.S. before introduction of the vaccine, and it is considered to be nearly 100 percent effective against these strains.

Special risk-groupsChildren at special risk (e.g., sickle cell disease and those without a functioning spleen) require additional protection using the PCV13, with the more extensive PPSV-23 given after the second year of life or two months after the PCV13 dose:

See also
 Streptococcus pneumoniae
 Pneumonia
 Conjugate vaccine

References

Further reading

External links
 Pneumococcal Vaccines World Health Organization (WHO)
 
 PATH's Vaccine Resource Library pneumococcus resources
 

Vaccines